Amanita is the second studio album by American rock band Bardo Pond, released on April 3, 1996. It was released as a single CD and cassette on Matador Records, their first release on the label, and as a double vinyl LP on Drunken Fish Records with two bonus tracks. Counting their four early self-released cassettes, this is the band's sixth or seventh album, but is generally viewed as their third officially-released album.

Background
The album title refers to the highly toxic mushroom genus Amanita, a few of which have hallucinogenic properties.  (The pre-release cassette was entitled The High Frequency, causing the album to occasionally still be called this.) "RM" is named after one of the band's father figures and collaborators (as Hash Jar Tempo), New Zealand guitarist Roy Montgomery.

A Drunken Fish mail-order catalog described the album thus:

The album was recorded at Studio Red.

Reception 

Amanita was very well-received. Alternative Press gave the album a perfect score, while Ned Raggett, reviewing the album for AllMusic, described it as "stunning", "astonishing" & "inspiring", noting that their sound hadn't changed "all that much" despite "whipping up just as compelling a mix of drone, volume, and blissout as before". Similarly positive was Deborah Sprague of Trouser Press, who noted the shorter song lengths in comparison to their previous album, writing: "The free-form guitar scrawls of “Limerick” and “Tantric Porno” refract chaos in much the same way prog-rock forefathers like Ash Ra Tempel did — but by compacting the commotion into four- and five-minute bursts and all but eliminating passages of blissed-out trance, Bardo Pond makes sure not to lose control of the universe it has created."

Legacy
In his book Gimme Indie Rock, Andrew Earles wrote of the album's "wide-ranging influence, blowing minds within the more adventurous indie rock-based realms [...] reaching into the then-blooming stoner-metal (or stoner-rock) scene, and establishing a historical milestone for today's right-headed bands that were too young the first time around." In 2016, Pitchfork ranked it the 28th greatest shoegaze album of all time, writing that "[g]uitarists and brothers Michael and John Gibbons uncoil blasted-out lines that instinctively channel what the 1960s psychedelic godfathers 13th Floor Elevators called “the third voice.” Here, Bardo Pond find their power in churning jam structures, the kind that suggest someone left Neil Young and Crazy Horse in a barn and returned a few days later to find them still going, their jangle pleasantly warped." Stuart Braithwaite of Mogwai considers it to be his favourite Bardo Pond album, describing it as "one huge piece of music".

Track listing 
All lyrics written by Isobel Sollenberger; all music composed by Bardo Pond (Isobel Sollenberger, Michael Gibbons, John Gibbons, Clint Takeda, and Joe Culver).

CD and cassette editions
 "Limerick" – 10:21
 "Sentence" – 5:08
 "Tantric Porno" – 6:13
 "Wank" – 5:28
 "The High Frequency" – 6:51
 "Sometimes Words" – 4:38
 "Yellow Turban" – 7:38
 "Rumination" – 6:22
 "Be a Fish" – 4:42
 "Tapir Song" – 7:32
 "RM" – 9:18

Vinyl edition
 "Limerick" – 10:21
 "Sentence" – 5:08
 "Tantric Porno" – 6:13
 "Wank" – 5:28
 "The High Frequency" – 6:51
 "Sometimes Words" – 4:38
 "Clean Sweep" – 3:53
 "Yellow Turban" – 7:38
 "Rumination" – 6:22
 "Be a Fish" – 4:42
 "Tapir Song" – 7:32
 "Brambles" – 3:41
 "RM" – 9:18

Personnel 
Bardo Pond
 Isobel Sollenberger – lead vocals, flute
 Michael Gibbons – guitar, vocals
 John Gibbons – guitar, vocals
 Clint Takeda – bass
 Joe Culver – drums, vocals

Additional personnel
 Greg Calbi – mastering
 J. Cox – production, engineering
 David Frank – assistant engineer

References 

1996 albums
Bardo Pond albums
Matador Records albums